Amphiplica plutonica is a species of sea snail, a marine gastropod mollusk in the family Caymanabyssiidae.

Distribution
This marine species was found in the Cayman Trench.

Description 
The maximum recorded shell length is 10.8 mm.

Habitat 
Minimum recorded depth is 6600 m. Maximum recorded depth is 7225 m.

References

External links

Caymanabyssiidae
Gastropods described in 1999